Gail Biggs (born 25 August 1970) is a former professional tennis player from Australia.

Biggs, who comes from Queensland, played on the professional tour in the 1990s. Competing as a wildcard, she featured in the singles main draw of the 1996 Australian Open, where she was beaten in the first round by Ludmila Richterová. She won an ITF singles title at Mount Pleasant in 1997 and the following year reached her best ranking of 200 in the world.

ITF Circuit finals

Singles: 2 (1–1)

Doubles: 19 (7–12)

References

External links
 
 

1970 births
Living people
Australian female tennis players
Tennis people from Queensland
20th-century Australian women
21st-century Australian women